The Jordan River Learning Federation  (abbreviated as JRLF) is a government co-educational comprehensive early learning centre, primary and secondary school, trade training centre, and school farm located in , a northern suburb of Hobart, Tasmania, Australia. Established in 1957 as Bridgewater High School, the school caters for approximately 300 students from birth to Year K and then to 12. The school is administered by the Tasmanian Department of Education.

In 2019 student enrolments for the high school were 313.

Organisational structure
As a federation of schools, the JRLF comprises:

three primary campuses that cater for students from birth to Year 5
a Middle School campus for students in Years 6 to 8
a Senior School campus for students in Years 9 to 12.
a Trade Training Centre catering for students who wish to focus on specific skills-based vocational education and training courses, and
a School Farm that runs special programs catering for students from birth to Year 12.

The school sites feature well landscaped grounds with up-to-date play equipment.

See also 
 List of schools in Tasmania
 Education in Tasmania

References

External links 
 

Public high schools in Hobart
Educational institutions established in 1977
1977 establishments in Australia